Digital magazine may refer to:

Online magazine
Electronic journal
Digital edition of a print magazine